Tocopherol (alpha) transfer protein-like is a protein that in humans is encoded by the TTPAL gene.

References

Further reading